Dolly mixture is a British confection, consisting of a variety of multi-coloured fondant shapes, such as cubes and cylinders with subtle flavourings, and sugar-coated jellies. 

The origin of the name is uncertain. It has been passed down through family history that the name came from the daughter of one of its salesmen, Mr. Charlie Clayton,  who managed to secure a large order when they were being shown to potential buyers ("Dolly" was the pet name for his eldest daughter, Dorothy), but some people have speculated it originated around the time of the British Raj in India, as dal (or dhal) is a dried mixture of beans, peas, or legumes of different sizes and colours. Over time the name dhal mixture is thought to have led to the name dolly mixture.

In the UK, Dolly Mix is produced under the Barratt brand, now owned by Tangerine Confectionery.

The Goon Show character Bluebottle was frequently rewarded or bribed, with a quantity of dolly mixture, jelly babies, or similar sweets.

See also
Liquorice allsorts

References 

British confectionery
Candy